Ptochus planoculis, is a species of weevil found in Sri Lanka.

Description
This species has a body length is about 3 mm. Body black, with uniform light brown scales. Eyes subdorsal and almost plane. Rostrum broader than long with dilated genae. Antennae piceous. Prothorax transverse. Scutelluln distinct. Elytra broadly ovate with truncate base.

References 

Curculionidae
Insects of Sri Lanka
Beetles described in 1944